Parahelpis is a genus of Australian jumping spiders that was first described by Joanna Gardzińska & Marek Michał Żabka in 2010.  it contains only two species, found only in New South Wales and Queensland: P. abnormis and P. smithae.

References

Salticidae genera
Salticidae
Spiders of Australia